SU Aurigae is a T Tauri-type variable star in the constellation Auriga. It is located about 500 light-years (150 parsecs) away in the Taurus-Auriga Star Forming Region. Its apparent magnitude is 9.30, which is dim enough that it cannot be seen with the unaided eye.

SU Aurigae's spectral type of G2IIIne means that it is a G-type star with an effective temperature similar to the Sun. The III in the spectral type refers to its luminosity, which is much higher than normal G-type main sequence stars and would put it in the giant star class. However, it is only about 4 million years old, which is relatively young for a star - young protostars like SU Aurigae are luminous because they are larger, not condensing into a normal size until they are older.

SU Aurigae is known to have a circumstellar protoplanetary disk surrounding it, which is typical of many T Tauri stars. SU Aurigae's disk has a high inclination of 62° and is nearly perpendicular to the plane of sky, so orbiting protoplanets or comets may be the cause of why there are drops in the amount of light detected. SU Aurigae's proper motion and distance is similar to AB Aurigae, a better known pre-main-sequence star, meaning that the two may form a very wide binary system; if not, they are still in the same star association.

References

Auriga (constellation)
T Tauri stars
Aurigae, SU
G-type giants
022925
282624
BD+30 0743